Krzyżowa (derived from the Polish word krzyż, meaning "cross") may refer to any of the following villages in Poland:

Krzyżowa, Bolesławiec County in Lower Silesian Voivodeship (south-west Poland)
Krzyżowa, Lubin County in Lower Silesian Voivodeship
Krzyżowa, Świdnica County in Lower Silesian Voivodeship
Krzyżowa, Silesian Voivodeship (south Poland)